The Snipex Rhino Hunter is a civilian version of the Snipex M rifle chambered for .50 BMG, developed by the Ukrainian company XADO-Holding Ltd.

Design
The Snipex Rhino Hunter is a bolt-action bullpup with a rotating bolt, and is equipped with a muzzle brake. The bolt has a special flag indicator that allows controlling the degree of bolt locking. For ease of use in the dark, the indicator is made of luminophore.

To reduce recoil, the rifle uses the inertia recoil system, which includes spring-loaded assemblies and hydraulic or spring shock absorbers. The shock absorbers are built into the upper receiver, which allows shooting with the upper receiver set against any surface. Recoil energy is partially reduced due to the muzzle brake.

History
The rifle was first presented in October 2016 at the XIII International Specialized Exhibition “Arms and Security” in Kyiv.

See also
Snipex T-Rex

References

External links
 REPORT ON THE RESULTS OF XVI INTERNATIONAL SPECIALIZED EXHIBITION ARMS AND SECURITY ‑ 2019

Hunting rifles
Single-shot bolt-action rifles